is a traditional Japanese confection. Of the many varieties of manjū, most have an outside made from flour, rice powder, kudzu, and buckwheat, and a filling of anko (red bean paste), usually made from boiled adzuki beans and sugar. Manjū is sometimes made with other fillings such as chestnut jam. In Hawaii, one can find Okinawan manjū that are made with a filling of purple sweet potato, butter, milk, sugar, and salt, but the most common filling is bean paste, of which the several varieties include koshian, tsubuan, and tsubushian.

History
Manju is a traditional Japanese flour-based pastry (instead of rice-based like mochi). It originated in China under the name  mantou in Chinese, but became known as manjū when it came to Japan. In 1341, a Japanese envoy who came back from China brought back mantou with him and started to sell it as nara-manjū. This was said to be the origin of Japanese manjū. Since then, it has been eaten for nearly 700 years by Japanese people. Now it can be found in many Japanese sweet shops. Its low price is a reason that it is popular.

Varieties

Of the myriad varieties of manjū, some more common than others.
 Matcha (green tea) manjū is one of the most common. In this case, the outside of the manjū has a green tea flavor and is colored green.
 Mizu (water) manjū is traditionally eaten in the summertime and contains a flavored bean filling. The exterior of the mizu manjū is made with kuzu starch, which gives the dough a translucent, jelly-like appearance.
 Also, manjū can have different flavored fillings, such as orange-flavored cream.
 As is the case with many Japanese foods, in some parts of Japan, one can find manjū unique to that region, such as the maple leaf-shaped momiji manjū in Hiroshima and Miyajima.
 The regional variety of the Saitama prefecture is called Jumangoku manjū.

See also
 Daifuku
 List of Japanese desserts and sweets
 Mamador
 Mantou (Chinese plain steamed bun), etymologically the origin of the word, although in modern Chinese the term for filled buns is baozi
 Manti (Turkic) and mandu (Korean), filled dumplings with the names being cognate with mantou and manjū
 Momiji Manju
 Nikuman
 Tangyuan
 Kozhukkatta is a steamed dumpling made from rice flour, with a filling of grated coconut, jaggery, or chakkavaratti in South India.

References

External links 
 
 Kashiwaya (Japanese)
 Kashiwaya Usukawa Manju(Instagram)

Wagashi
Buddhist cuisine